Notonecta, or the common backswimmer, is a genus of backswimmer insects in the family Notonectidae. Species in this genus include:
Notonecta borealis
Notonecta glauca
Notonecta hoffmanni
Notonecta indica
Notonecta insulata
Notonecta irrorata
Notonecta kirbyi
Notonecta lobata
Notonecta lunata
Notonecta maculata
Notonecta marmorea
Notonecta meridionalis
Notonecta montezuma
Notonecta obliqua
Notonecta ochrothoe
Notonecta pallidula
Notonecta petrunkevitchi
Notonecta raleighi
Notonecta repanda
Notonecta shooteri
Notonecta spinosa
Notonecta uhleri
Notonecta undulata
Notonecta unifasciata
Notonecta viridis

References

 
Nepomorpha genera
Notonectidae